Myzomorphus is a genus of beetles in the family Cerambycidae, containing the following species:

 Myzomorphus amabilis (Tippmann, 1960)
 Myzomorphus birai Bezark, Galileo & Santos-Silva 2016
 Myzomorphus flavipes Galileo, 1987
 Myzomorphus gounellei Lameere, 1912
 Myzomorphus herteli Gilmour, 1960
 Myzomorphus poultoni Lameere, 1912
 Myzomorphus quadripunctatus (Gray in Griffith, 1831)
 Myzomorphus scutellatus Sallé, 1849
 Myzomorphus sparsimflambellatus Zajciw, 1963

References

Prioninae